Dafne Mansapit-Shimizu is a Chamorro politician from Guam. She was appointed the Director of Guam Department of Revenue and Taxation (DRT) on 17 January 2019. According to Governor Lou Leon Guerrero, under Mansapit-Shimizu's leadership the DRT had administered "some of the most ambitious and broadly impactful programs ever implemented by any agency in our island’s history". 

During the COVID-19 pandemic this included the administration of emergency payments and the extension of child tax credit. She has also worked to enforce the collection of unpaid taxes across Guam, by improving technical infrastructure and human resourcing. She is Vice Chairperson of the Cannabis Control Board in Guam, which legalised the use of recreational cannabis in April 2019.

References

External links 
 Guam Department of Revenue and Taxation

1973 births
Chamorro people
Guamanian women in politics
Living people
21st-century American women